Mehar Tehsil is an administrative subdivision (tehsil) of Dadu District in the Sindh province of Pakistan. It is famous for the production of Henna or Mehndi. The Tehsil has a population of 460,000 (2017 census). Major markets in the city include Shahi Bazaar, Resham Galli
, Sonaarki Bazaar and Ghanta Ghar market. The Kakul Waah runs through the city; an old canal which is still used for the irrigation.

History
According to records, in 1848  Mehar Taluka was created as a subdivision of Dadu District during British rule with the town of Mehar as the headquarters. The taluka, along with the rest of Sindh, was for a time part of the Bombay Presidency of British India.

The Imperial Gazetteer of India, written over a century ago during British rule, describes the taluka as follows:

"Mehar.- Tāluka of Lārkāna District, Sindh, Bombay, lying between elev 162ft, with an area of 328 square miles. The population in 1901 was 58,434, compared with 48,320 in 1891. The tāluka contains 64 villages, of which Mehar is the headquarters. The density, 178 persons per square mile, greatly exceeds the District average. The land revenue and cesses in 1903-4 amounted to 2.8 lakhs. The tāluka is irrigated by the Western Nāra and one of its feeders, the stable crop is jowār and rice. Prior to the floods of 1874 Mehar was fertile, but the water has now become brackish and all gardens have perished. Cultivation near the hills on the west depends entirely on rainfall."

Administrative divisions
Mehar Tehsil is administratively subdivided into 20 Union Councils.

Union Councils
 Mehar
 Balishah(including old ancient Village Kothi Khokhar)
 Bothro(Sardar Mehboob Ali Dahar)
 Baledai
 Thariri Mohabat   
 Fareedabad
 Charo 
 Gahi Mahessar
 Kolachi
 Khan Jo Goth
 Mandwani
 Mureed Lakhier
 Nau Goth (saint saedi mosani tomb)
 Qazi Aarif
 Radhan (railway station)
 Saeedpur 
 Shah Panjo 
 Betto 
 Sobho Khan Magsi
 Sindhi Butra

Locality
Mehar is a town in Dadu District. It is administrated by the Government of Sindh. It is divided in 20 Union Councils.

References

Talukas of Sindh
Populated places in Dadu District